The Chief of Joint Capabilities (CJC) is the head of the Joint Capabilities Group (JCG) in the Australian Department of Defence, part of the Australian Defence Organisation. This position was created on 1 July 2017. The current chief is Lieutenant General John Frewen, who was appointed to the position in September 2021.

Structure
The Chief of Joint Capabilities is responsible for coordinating the various capabilities within the Australian Defence Force. The following four commands report to the Chief.

The Australian Civil-Military Centre (ACMC) is responsible for researching and advising the improvement of civil-military-police collaboration in civil-military co-operation and civil-military operations in the stabilization of fragile states, peacekeeping, humanitarian aid, and emergency management. ACMC also engages with Australian Government departments and agencies including the Australian Federal Police and the Department of Foreign Affairs and Trade, the United Nations, and non-government organisations.

Australian Defence College
The Australian Defence College (ADC) is responsible for the delivery of professional military education, command and staff education, and joint warfare training for the ADF. The ADC is the umbrella organisation for the Centre for Defence and Strategic Studies (CDSS), the Australian Command and Staff College (ACSC), and the Australian Defence Force Academy (ADFA). In 2019 the Centre for Defence and Strategic Studies and the Australian Command and Staff College will be merged to become the Australian War College.

The ADC is also manages the following:
Centre for Defence Leadership & Ethics
Centre for Defence Research
Capability Technology Management College
Centre for Defence Leadership and Ethics
Defence Learning Branch
Defence Force Chaplains College
Defence Force School of Languages
Defence International Training Centre
ADF Warfare Training Centre
ADF Peacekeeping Centre

The Commander of the Australian Defence College is Major General Mick Ryan.

Joint Health Command
The Joint Health Command (JHC) is led by the Surgeon General of the Australian Defence Force, Rear Admiral Sarah Sharkey, and is responsible for the delivery of military medicine and joint healthcare services to Australian Defence Force personnel, including military psychiatry and rehabilitation services. The JHC is also responsible for the development of the health preparedness of ADF personnel for operations and the coordination of health units for deployment in support of operations.

Joint Logistics Command
The Joint Logistics Command (JLC) is responsible for the planning, coordination and delivery of military logistics, the evaluation of joint logistics capabilities and requirements, explosive ordnance, fuel services, joint movements, logistics information systems, and Defence's supply chain (warehousing, distribution, materiel maintenance and retail store services). The current Commander of the Joint Logistics Command is MAJGEN Jason Walk. The Joint Logistics Command is made up of the: 
Explosive Ordnance Branch
Fuel Services Branch
Logistics Assurance Branch
Logistics Systems Branch
Strategic Logistics Branch
Supply Chain Branch
1 Joint Movements Group

Information Warfare Division
The Information Warfare Division is responsible for information warfare, cyber security, and command, control, coordination and communications (C4), and Space capabilities for the Australian Defence Force. The Head for Information Warfare Division is Major General Susan Coyle. The Information Warfare Division is made up of the:
Joint Intelligence and Cyber Branch
C2 and Battle Management Capability Branch
Capability Support Directorate
Joint Cyber Unit
Space and Communications Branch

Joint Military Police Unit
The Joint Military Police Unit is the unified military police agency of the Australian Defence Force led by the Provost Marshal responsible for general policing, law enforcement, and the Australian Defence Force Investigative Service.

Reserve and Youth Division
The Reserve and Youth Division (RYD) is responsible for the capacity building of the Australian Defence Force reserve capabilities of the Royal Australian Naval Reserve, Australian Army Reserve and Royal Australian Air Force Reserve and the governance of the Australian Defence Force Cadets Scheme.

Women, Peace and Security
The Chief of Joint Capabilities also acts as the Joint Capability Manager for Women, Peace and Security for the development and implementation of the Australian National Action Plan on Women, Peace and Security. The Gender Advisor to the Chief of the Defence Force supports this role.

Chiefs of Joint Capabilities
The following officers have been appointed as Chief of Joint Capabilities:

References

Leadership of the Australian Defence Force